Jens Ulltveit-Moe (born July 16, 1942 in Drammen) is a Norwegian businessperson. He founded Umoe in 1984, and retains ownership of the group. Ulltveit-Moe is CEO of Umoe, and was formerly Chairman of Petroleum Geo-Services.

Biography
Ulltveit-Moe was educated at the Norwegian School of Economics in Bergen and School of International and Public Affairs, Columbia University in the United States. Umoe was founded as Ulltveit-Moe-gruppen by him in 1984, and had various investments mainly related to shipbuilding and engineering. These were sold, and instead Umoe ventured into catering through Umoe Catering. Jens Ulltveit-Moe has been president of Confederation of Norwegian Enterprise.

In 2008 he sold the Knutsen OAS tanker fleet and started investing in renewable energy. Umoe Bioenergy cultivates sugarcane in Brazil for the production of 230 000 tonnes of bioethanol per year.

Umoe Solar was developing a facility for the production of 5 000 tonnes of poly-silicon in Miramichi, Canada.[1] In May 2010 the project was postponed until an unknown date.

Ulltveit-Moe donated NOK 70 million for the creation of a climate house in Oslo to communicate research-based knowledge about global warming, especially to youth.[3]

Jens Ulltveit-Moe has held several prominent public positions and occasionally comments on climate-related issues in the media.

He is a fellow of the Norwegian Academy of Technological Sciences.

References

1942 births
Living people
Norwegian chief executives
People from Drammen
School of International and Public Affairs, Columbia University alumni
Members of the Norwegian Academy of Technological Sciences